Accambray is a surname of French origin. Notable people with the surname include:

Isabelle Accambray (born 1956), French discus thrower
Jacques Accambray (born 1950), French hammer thrower
William Accambray (born 1988), French handball player

French-language surnames